The Carrivick Sisters are twins Laura and Charlotte Carrivick from South Devon, England, who perform as a musical duo. They combine original songs, based on old stories, legends and folklore from their local area, with American bluegrass and old time music.

The Carrivick Sisters have been performing as a duo since 2006 and turned professional in 2007. They were finalists for the BBC Radio 2 Young Folk Award in 2010.

Their 2013 album Over the Edge featured Blair Dunlop on harmony vocals and, like their previous album From the Fields, was produced by Josh Rusby (brother of folk singer Kate Rusby).

Discography

References

External links
 Official website

2006 establishments in England
British identical twins
English bluegrass music groups
English folk musical groups
English musical duos
Female musical duos
Identical twin females
Musical groups established in 2006
Musical groups from Devon
Old-time bands
Twin musical duos
English twins
Folk music duos